Banana boat is a descriptive nickname that was given to fast ships, also called banana carriers, engaged in the banana trade. They were designed to transport easily spoiled bananas rapidly from tropical growing areas to North America and Europe. They often carried passengers as well as fruit.

History 

Surplus naval vessels were converted in some cases in the search for speed with Standard Fruit converting four U.S. Navy destroyer hulls, without machinery, to the banana carriers Masaya, Matagalpa, Tabasco and Teapa in 1932. Modern banana boats tend to be reefer ships or other refrigerated ships that carry cooled bananas on one leg of a voyage, then general cargo on the return leg.

The large fruit companies such as Standard Fruit Company, United Fruit Company in the United States and Elders & Fyffes Shipping, which itself came under control of the United Fruit Company in 1910, in the banana trade acquired or built ships for the purpose, some strictly banana carriers and others with passenger accommodations.

United Fruit operated a large fleet, advertised as The Great White Fleet, for over a century until its successor Chiquita Brands International sold the last ships in a sale with leaseback in 2007 of eight refrigerated and four container ships that transported approximately 70% of the company's bananas to North America and Europe. At one time the fleet consisted of 100 refrigerated ships and was the world's largest private fleet with some being lent to the Central Intelligence Agency to support the attempted overthrow of the Castro regime in the Bay of Pigs landing. 

Travelers to and from the West Indies also used the banana boats as a form of transportation. The English cricket team that toured the West Indies in 1959–1960 used banana boats to travel across the Atlantic and between the islands. They were better known for bringing West Indian immigrants to Great Britain, and to say that someone came off a banana boat was a derogatory phrase used by those who objected to their arrival. It fell out of use in the 1970s, as by then most of the British African-Caribbean community had been born in the UK.

In popular culture 
The term "banana boat" is perhaps best known today in the context of Harry Belafonte's 1956 hit recording "Day-O (The Banana Boat Song)".

Gallery

See also
 Banana republic

References

External links
 Fruit Shipping Companies / Banana Boats (List of fruit companies with links to fleet lists)
 Antigua/Quirigua/Veragua/Jamaica/Talamanca/Chiriqui deck/cabin plans
 1950 United Fruit Company promotional booklet showing Antigua/Quirigua/Veragua/Jamaica/Talamanca/Chiriqui examples of passenger accommodations
 On board a Vaccaro Line steamer
 Interior views of sister ships Contessa and Cefalu
 "The Banana Boats Are In!

Ship types
Nautical terminology
 
History of international trade